The Star of Kazan (2004) is a novel by Eva Ibbotson.

It won the Nestlé Children's Book Prize Silver Award and was shortlisted for the Carnegie Medal.

Setting 
The story takes place over a year in the Austro-Hungarian  and German empires in the early 20th century. Certain events are discussed, however, that are set in the late 19th century or other parts of Europe. Though the story is fictional some people and events from actual history are discussed (such as Emperor Franz-Josef and the founding of the German empire). The author, with ancestry from Vienna herself, dedicates the second chapter of the book to discussing life there at that time.

Plot summary
The story opens with two Viennese servants, Ellie and Sigrid, who, on their day off, discover a newborn baby girl left behind in a church of the alpine village of Pettelsdorf. With the infant is a note asking for her to be taken to a nunnery in Vienna, but when Ellie and Sigrid find that the nunnery is in quarantine for typhus, they decide to take the baby home and raise her as their own. They name her Annika after Ellie's mother and decide not to give her away after the typhus quarantine is over.

Twelve years pass and it is now 1908. For Annika, life in Vienna is perfect. She attends a local school whilst helping the adult maids with the day-to-day duties of running the household, has her friends, Pauline and Stefan, and loves her adopted family (Ellie and Sigrid, and the three professors who they all work for) very much.

Annika is asked by Loremarie Egghart, a snobby rich girl whom Annika despises, to read to her great-aunt. Annika does so and the two (Annika and Loremarie's great aunt) become friends, telling each other about their lives. Loremarie's great aunt was a famous theatre personality who went by the stage name La Rondine. They become so close that the great-aunt leaves Annika her jewels when she dies, having been told that the jewels are pastings of the real ones which she had sold through a jeweler.

Annika is delighted but sometimes wonders about the missing piece of the puzzle: the mystery of her real mother and why she was abandoned. When the beautiful, rich Frau Edeltraut von Tannenberg comes to the professors household and announces she is Annika’s long lost mother, Annika is delighted.  Her mother takes her to Spittal, the family's estate in Germany, and she meets her brother Hermann, her uncle Oswald, and her cousin Gudrun, but she doesn’t enjoy it. The mansion is derelict and gloomy, the walls are crumbling, and the paint peeling. Due to her newfound membership of the aristocracy, she is forbidden from attending the village school or helping with domestic chores. She meets a friendly Romany/gypsy boy called Zed who works on the farm and cares for Hermann's horse Rocco. Although her friends back in Vienna are pleased for Annika they can't help but feel uneasy about the whole thing - especially Ellie.

Annika's mother asks her to sign some important documents without really explaining them, and then goes to Zurich. Annika has actually signed over La Rondine's jewels, including her famous Star of Kazan, but is unaware of what she has done. When her mother comes back, she says a relative died and left them much money, but in fact she sold some of Annika's jewels so Hermann can go to the army school that he wants to attend, and Annika can have galoshes, which her mother buys a size too small.

One day while Annika is walking with Zed and Hector, the dog, Hector discovers some remnants of La Rondine's trunk in the lake, but there is no sign of the jewels. Upon asking Frau Edeltraut of the trunk's mysterious appearance, she retorts that Zed must have stolen it. Afraid of being arrested, Zed flees Spittal with Rocco and arrives in Vienna to tell the professors his suspicions about Annika's mother.

Annika is then sent away to a very harsh boarding school for young ladies called Grossenfluss, but the professors, Ellie, and Stefan manage to rescue her after discovering that a pupil died by suicide, but the police were not allowed to investigate and were told that it was an accident. Annika manages to escape back home to Vienna, and those she loves.

However, Frau Edeltraut hears of the incident at Grossenfluss and visits Vienna to collect Annika. Pauline, upset from the proceedings, decides to spend her time on her hobby of collecting news articles of heroic deeds, but spots a piece stating that the lawyer who signed the birth certificate that Frau Edeltraut had of Annika's was imprisoned. This spurs Pauline to visit the midwife in Pettelsdorf, only to discover that the women had a stroke twenty years beforehand and can only sign her name. With this knowledge Pauline returns to Vienna and informs everyone about the forgery of the birth certificate. By this time, Annika is already on the boat with Frau Edeltraut and about to set off on the voyage, but fortunately Herr Egghart has arrived in his motor car, and they speed to the river Danube. They manage to alert Annika and inform her that Frau Edeltraut is not her mother, which Annika instantly acknowledges and jumps into the river to evade her.

With Frau Edeltraut discredited, Annika splits the wealth of the jewel sales with the Eggharts and proceeds to live a content life with her friends, Zed and the professors and Sigrid and Ellie, who she now recognises as her mother.

Characters
Some of the main characters are: Professor Emil, Professor Gertrude, Professor Julius, Zed, Stefan, Pauline, Gudrun, Loremarie, Hermann, Rocco, Edeltraut von Tannenberg, and of course Annika.

Zedekiah (Zed)
Zed is a friendly gypsy boy who works for Edeltraut von Tannenberg. He is the son of a horse dealer and is descended from gypsies. His mother is dead and his father died trying to stop a fight when Zed was very little. Edeltraut von Tannenberg's father, and the master at the time, had ordered a horse from Zed's father before the father’s death so when the horse was delivered, Zed came with it. The master gave Zed a job and sent him to school. The horse, Rocco, was bought for the master's grandson, Hermann, but always preferred Zed, so the Master decided to get his grandson another horse and just before he had his stroke he left the horse to him.

Stefan
Stefan Bodek is the son of a poor washerwoman. His father is a groundsman in the Prater. He is the third of six brothers and the strongest. He wants to be an engineer but fears that he can't afford to study.

Annika 
Annika is the protagonist of the story. A foundling, she is found and taken in by Sigrid and Ellie. She has a real talent for cooking, but she is very trusting.

Ellie
Ellie has worked for the professors as their cook since she was 14 years old. She is a very good cook like her mother and grandmother before her. Ellie often goes on walks in the countryside with Sigrid on their days off from work.

Sigrid
Sigrid works for the professors as a housemaid. She works well, but can be a little 'snappy' at times. Sigrid is very good friends with Ellie and is a hardworking role model for Annika.

Pauline
Pauline is Annika and Stefan's friend who lives with her grandfather and helps him look after his bookshop. She is a thin girl with frizzy black hair. She loves reading books and keeps a book with newspaper clippings about heroic people. She suffers from agoraphobia.

The Professors
The professors are all siblings and have lived in the same house all their lives. None of them are married and are unlikely to be any time soon.

Professor Gertrude is the youngest and the only woman. She plays the harp and always smells of lavender water. She suffers from cold feet and needs a hot water bottle to sleep. She is sometimes very anxious, doesn't smile much, and always has bits of food on her skirt.

Professor Emil is the middle child. He has a "sensitive stomach" and cannot cope with spicy foods. He is an art expert and is able to tell who painted a picture by looking at the feet of its main subjects.

Professor Julius, who specialises in geology, is the eldest. He was once engaged but his bride died before they could be wed. He has a picture of her in his room and has Annika pick out and arrange flowers in front of the picture every Saturday morning.

Edeltraut von Tannenberg 
Frau Edeltraut von Tannenberg comes forward as Annika's mother. Edeltraut has one sister, whose husband helps Edeltraut steal Annika's jewels. Edeltraut’s husband gambles away all their money and flees to America, leaving Edeltraut to take care of their son, Hermann, and the family estate until Hermann comes of age.

Hermann
Hermann is Edeltraut's son, and heir to the family estate.  He is a couple of years younger than Annika and obsessed with all things marshal. Hoping for a future military career, he follows the timetable of the officer school he dreams of attending each day.

Loremarie 
Loremarie is a snobby little girl whose father is very rich.  She never really cared for her great aunt, known in the theater as La Rondine.

Hector
Hector is a water spaniel who was bought for Hermann by his grandfather. Zed told Annika that Hermann wanted to train Hector to be an army dog and to not be scared of guns of explosions, so Hermann tied firecrackers onto Hector's leg and tail.  Hector was blinded in one eye and lost one of his legs and most of his tail because of this. Edeltraut wanted Hector put down but Zed saved him. Hector is described by Zed as being able to swim like a fish even with only three legs. Hector likes to collect items from the lake, including his favorite sock suspender.

Gudrun
Gudrun is a rather pathetic looking girl who is the daughter of Edeltraut von Tannenberg's sister and cousin to Hermann, whom she worships as a hero. She always wants whatever Hermann desires. Her most rebellious scene is when she ignores her mother and tells Ellie and the professors that Annika has been sent to Grossenfluss. Gudrun is not as evil as her mother, she is just uninformed.

Rocco
Rocco is a gentle, quarter-Lipizzaner breed bay-coloured horse belonging to Zed.  Although the Master bought him originally for Hermann, he changed his mind and left Rocco to Zed shortly before having a stroke.

La Rondine
La Rondine is the Loremarie's great-aunt. Annika used to read to her because Loremarie was disgusted by her. La Rondine told Annika about her life and how she used to be a great actress. She had a chest of jewels she thought to be fake, and as she died without knowing that they were real, she bequeathed them to Annika in her will.

References

2004 British novels
Novels by Eva Ibbotson
Novels set in Vienna
Macmillan Publishers books